Bart Fletcher is an American actor in many television series and shorts. But he is best known for his role in the 2008 cult sci-fi/ horror hit One-Eyed Monster. In 2011, he wrote, produced and directed the short film Oh Oliver!.

Career

In 2008, he had a starring role in the sci-fi/ horror film One-Eyed Monster as Lance. He has had minor roles in Look Closer (2010) and The Chicago 8 (2011).

In 2009-2010, he made voice over in many episodes of the Stan Lee/Disney produced animated series Time Jumper playing the voice of Terry Dixon, alongside Natasha Henstridge who did the voice of Charity Vyle.

In 2011, Bart Fletcher branched out into writing and directing with his comedic short film, Oh, Oliver!, a 16-minutes film about one day in the life of Oliver Spagnola.

Filmography

Director, producer, writer
2011: Oh Oliver! (short)

Actor
Films
2008: Dog Tags as Andy Forte
2008: One-Eyed Monster as Lance
2010: White Wall as Medic
2010: Look Closer as Vander
2011: The Chicago 8 as Officer Riggio (completed)

Television
2005: General Hospital (TV series) (in one episode "Young A.J. Quartermaine" as Young A.J. Quartermai)
2006: Untold Stories of the ER (TV series, 1 episode "Director Down" as Kyle)
2007: The Erotic Traveler (TV series, 1 episode "Carnal Cabaret" as Lenny)
2007: Veronica Mars (TV series, 1 episode "Un-American Graffiti" as Jimmy)
2007-8: Everybody Hates Chris (TV series, 2 episodes "Everybody Hates Kwanzaa" and "Everybody Hates Being Cool" as Johnny Boy in both)
2011: Time Jumper (TV series, 8 episodes as Terry Dixon)

Shorts
2004: As Cool as Jennifer as Mike (short)
2005: Little Bear as Jake (short)
2006: Lonely in Los Angeles as Rookie Cop (short)
2009: Death in Charge as Brad (short)
2010: Designated as Cliff (short)
2011: Oh Oliver! as Robert (short)

References

External links
Official website

American male film actors
Place of birth missing (living people)
Year of birth missing (living people)
American male television actors
American film directors
Living people